Pieter-Steyn de Wet (born 8 January 1991) is a South African rugby union player for Floirac in the French Fédérale 1. His usual position is fly-half.

Paarl Gymnasium High School

De Wet attended the prestigious Paarl Gymnasium where he formed part of the 2008 1st XV which ended unbeaten and top of the SA schools log. They also destroyed the biggest winning margin record (35-8) in their annual interschools fixture against Paarl Boys’ High. A fixture that is regarded as the biggest schoolboy match in the world, attracting crowds from across  the globe.

Western Province

After school he joined Western Province where he won the u19 Currie Cup with a star studded team filled with future Springboks including Siya Kolisi, Damian de Allende, Eben Etsebeth, Frans Malherbe, Nizaam Carr, Scarra Ntubeni.

Free State Cheetahs and Shimlas

After a successful 2010 season with Western Province he agreed terms with SA u/20 coach Pine Pienaar to join the Free State Cheetahs. Pieter enjoyed an extended run in the Cheetahs’ junior- and Vodacom Cup teams and was included in the 2012 senior Currie Cup squad while still under 21.

De Wet represented the Shimlas in the 2013 Varsity Cup season making 6 appearances. He also previously made 4 substitute appearances for the Free State Cheetahs during the 2012 Vodacom Cup.

In April 2013 he moved west to join the  who were suffering a fly-half crisis due to Burton Francis and Francois Brummer being called into the  Super Rugby squad.

After his stint at the Griquas he was lured back to Bloemfontein and made his Currie Cup debut for the Free State Cheetahs in Kimberley, converting 3 tries in their 36-25 win over the Griquas.

Between 2013 and 2015 de Wet represented the Cheetahs and enjoyed stints with the Griquas before signing with the Southern Kings for two seasons.

Southern Kings

He represented the Eastern Cape-based side during the 2016 Currie Cup season and formed part of the 2017 Super Rugby squad. De Wet scored a late try to record an epic win over the Sharks in Port Elizabeth which highlighted their successful season. He went on to claim 11 selections in the colors of the Southern Kings in their 2017 Super Rugby season before the franchise got promoted to the Guinness PRO14.

He made his Guinness PRO14 debut against the Italian outfit Zebre on 23 September 2017, scoring two conversions and one penalty in their debut campaign before signing a deal to join French Pro D2 side Stade Aurillacois ahead of their 2018/19 season.

In the summer of 2020 the newly promoted CM Floirac Rugby kicked off a big recruitment project and surprised with the signing of De Wet from ProD2. He immediately made an impact by scoring all the team’s points in their last two encounters and concluded the short three-match season on a 100% kicking record from the tee.

References

South African rugby union players
Living people
1991 births
People from Theewaterskloof Local Municipality
Griquas (rugby union) players
Free State Cheetahs players
Rugby union fly-halves
Afrikaner people
Alumni of Paarl Gimnasium
Southern Kings players
Rugby union players from the Western Cape